Liger is a crossbreed between lion and tiger.

Liger may also refer to the following

Biology 

 Liger is a genus of spiders in the family Linyphiidae

Geography 

 Liger is the classical name of the river Loire, in modern-day France
 Liger (river), a tributary of the Bresle in northern France

People 
Jushin Thunder Liger (b.1964), a Japanese professional wrestler
Jushin Thunder Liger: Fist of Thunder, a movie about and starring the wrestler
Super Liger, Canadian wrestler better known as Chris Jericho (b. 1970)

Fiction 
Liger (film), a 2022 Indian Telugu-language film directed by Puri Jagannadh
Several mecha in the Zoids fictional universe are referred to as Ligers or Liger-type. These include:
Shield Liger
Blade Liger
Liger Zero
Energy Liger
Jushin Liger, an anime series